Mariana Codruţ (born 1 November 1956 in Prisacani, Romania) is a Romanian poet, writer and journalist.

Works 

Poetry:

 Măceşul din magazia de lemne (Junimea,1982).
 Schiţă de autoportret (Junimea, 1986).
 Tabieturile nopţii de vară (Cartea Românească, 1989).
 Existenţă acută (Cartea Românească, 1994).
 Blanc (Vinea, 2000).
 Ultima patrie (Paralela 45, 2007).
 Areal (Paralela 45, 2011)

Essay:

 Românul imparțial (Dacia, 2011)

Novels:

 Casa cu storuri galbene (Polirom, 1997).
 Nudul Dianei (Polirom, 2007).

Short stories:

 Ul Baboi şi alte povestiri (Polirom, 2004).

Anthologies:

 Cartea roz a comunismului (Versus, 2004, ed. Gabriel H. Decuble).
 Tovarăşe de drum. Experienţa feminină în communism (Polirom, 2008, eds. Dan Lungu, Radu Pavel Gheo); translated in Italian: Compagne di viaggio (Sandro Teti editore, Roma, 2011, transl. by Mauro Barindi, Anita Natascia Bernacchia, Maria Luisa Lombardo)

External links 
Book presentation of "The Nude of Diana" with English excerpt 
Poems by Mariana Codruţ 
Poems by the Club 8-group, a.o. by Mariana Codruţ 
Author's blog 
Article about the author by Bogdan Creţu in Ziarul de duminica 

Romanian women novelists
Romanian women short story writers
Romanian short story writers
Romanian women poets
Living people
1956 births